Ruutu+ Urheilu 1 is a package of Finnish sports-oriented television channels owned and operated by Nelonen.

The story of the channel originally goes all the way back to the launch of digital terrestrial television on 27 August 2001, when among the first DTT channels the free-to-air sports channel Urheilukanava was launched. Its sister channel Urheilu+kanava was launched in June 2007 as part of the PlusTV package. It broadcast as an encrypted pay channel, as opposed to its parent channel, which was free-to-air. Urheilu+kanava was replaced by Nelonen Sport Pro in February 2010 and Urheilukanava became Nelonen Sport at the same time. Nelonen Sport Pro was renamed to Nelonen Pro 1 and Nelonen Sport to Nelonen Pro 2 in January 2011. In February, Nelonen Pro 2 was encrypted.

Current programming

Ice hockey
SM-liiga

Football
Serie A
Veikkausliiga

Golf 
PGA Tour
LPGA Tour
European Tour
Major championships

Other sports
NFL
FIBA
Boxing
MotoGP
NASCAR
Speedway
Formula 3
FIA GT Series
Euroleague of basketball
Salibandyliiga of floorball
Superpesis league of Finnish baseball

Former programming
When the channel started out as Urheilu+kanava, they showed sports such as NASCAR, Campeonato Brasileiro, Campeonato Paulista (first time these sports were shown live in Finnish television), Germany national football team, UEFA Europa League, FA Cup Spanish La Liga, Copa del Rey, German Bundesliga, DFB-Pokal, DFB-Ligapokal, Major League Soccer, NBA, WNBA, Nordic Trophy and the Swatch FIVB World Tour of beach volley. It also had its own news service, Urheilu+Studio, which was similar to Nelonen Sport's Studio, but ran from 1 hour to 2,5 hours from Tuesdays to Fridays.

References

External links
www.nelonenpro.fi/

Television channels in Finland
Television channels and stations established in 2007